

A
Arrowhead,
Reggie Attache

B
Napoleon Barrel,
Big Bear,
Peter Blackbear,
E. Bobadash,
Lo Boutwell,
Fred Broker,
Ted Buffalo,
Elmer Busch

C
Pete Calac

D
Dick Deer Slayer,
Xavier Downwind

E
Eagle Feather

G
Joe Guyon,
Gray Horse

H
Bob Hill

J
Al Jolley,
Buck Jones

L
Nick Lassa,
Chim Lingrel,
Joe Little Twig,
Ted Lone Wolf

M
Emmett McLemore

N
Jack Nason,
Bill Newashe

P
Joe Pappio,
Stan Powell

R
Dave Running Deer

S
Stillwell Saunooke,
Ted St. Germaine

T
Jack Thorpe,
Jim Thorpe,
Baptiste Thunder

W
War Eagle,
Woodchuck Welmas,
Bill Winneshiek

References

 

Oorang Indians players
Oorang